Kosiska may refer to the following places in Poland:
Kosiska, Lower Silesian Voivodeship (south-west Poland)
Kosiska, Łódź Voivodeship (central Poland)